The siege of Metz during the Italian War of 1551–59 lasted from October 1552 to January (1-5), 1553.

The so-called Augsburg Interim came to an end when Protestant princes of the Schmalkaldic League approached Henry II of France and concluded the Treaty of Chambord, giving the free cities of Toul, Verdun, and Metz (the 'Three Bishoprics') to the Kingdom of France. The Holy Roman Emperor Charles V laid siege to the French garrison commanded by Francis, Duke of Guise.  Although cannonades destroyed large parts of the fortifications (see :fr:Remparts médiévaux de Metz), the Imperial army was unable to take the city. Stricken by typhus, dysentery, and scurvy, Charles' army was forced to abandon the siege along with the sick and wounded. Metz remained a French protectorate (:fr:République messine) until its annexation was formalized in 1648 by the Treaty of Westphalia.

References

References
 

Sieges involving France
Sieges involving the Holy Roman Empire
Sieges involving Spain
Siege
1552 in France
1553 in France
Conflicts in 1552
Conflicts in 1553
Italian War of 1551–1559
Charles V, Holy Roman Emperor